The 2007 Gastein Ladies was a tennis tournament played on outdoor clay courts. It was the first edition of the Gastein Ladies, and was part of the Tier III series of the 2007 WTA Tour. It took place in Bad Gastein, Austria, from 23 July until 29 July 2008. First-seeded Francesca Schiavone won the singles title and earned $25,840 first-prize money.

Finals

Singles 

 Francesca Schiavone defeated  Yvonne Meusburger 6–1, 6–4
 It was Schiavone's first career title after losing in eight previous finals.

Doubles 

 Lucie Hradecká /  Renata Voráčová defeated  Ágnes Szávay /  Vladimíra Uhlířová 6–3, 7–5

External links 
 Tournament draws
 ITF tournament edition details

2007 WTA Tour
2007
2007 in Austrian women's sport
July 2007 sports events in Europe
2007 in Austrian tennis